= Hans Gottfried Wang =

Norwegian politician

Hans Gottfried Wang (1795–??) was a Norwegian politician.

He was elected to the Norwegian Parliament in 1851, representing the constituency of Tønsberg. He worked as a newspaper published there. He served only one term.
